Thiacloprid is an insecticide of the neonicotinoid class.  Its mechanism of action is similar to other neonicotinoids and involves disruption of the insect's nervous system by stimulating nicotinic acetylcholine receptors.  Thiacloprid was developed by Bayer CropScience for use on agricultural crops to control of a variety of sucking and chewing insects, primarily aphids and whiteflies.

Regulation 

Thiacloprid has been banned in France since September 1, 2018.
The 5 neonicotinoids banned in France are Acetamiprid, Clothianidin, Imidacloprid, Thiacloprid and Thiamethoxam.

References

Other external links
Thiacloprid listing at pubchem pubchem.ncbi.nlm.nih.gov
Thiacloprid listing at toxnet toxnet.nlm.nih.gov (Reviewed 3/28/2019) 
Thiacloprid; Pesticide Tolerances: A Rule by the Environmental Protection Agency on 02/06/2013 federalregister.gov
Pesticide Fact Sheet Name of Chemical: ThiaclopridReason for Issuance: Conditional RegistrationDate Issued: September 26, 2003 www3.epa.gov 
PPDB: Pesticide Properties DataBase at University of Hertfordshire Describes Toxicity to Apis mellifera as 'Moderate' 
Briefing: Thiacloprid: A bee harming pesticide friendsoftheearth.uk (ca. 2014)

Insecticides
Thiazolidines
Chloropyridines
Nitriles
Neonicotinoids